K.B.  Ramaswamy' (born 20 February 1929) is a former Indian cricket umpire. He stood in eight Test matches between 1976 and 1983 and two ODI games in 1982.

See also
 List of Test cricket umpires
 List of One Day International cricket umpires

References

1929 births
Living people
Place of birth missing (living people)
Indian Test cricket umpires
Indian One Day International cricket umpires